Du Longquan (Chinese: 杜龙泉; born 29 May 1988) is a Chinese football player who currently plays for Chinese Super League side Wuhan Zall.

Club career
In 2007, Du Longquan started his professional footballer career with Chinese Super League side Dalian Shide when he was included in their first team squad. He would eventually make his league debut for Dalian on 4 November 2007 against Hangzhou Greentown, coming on as a substitute for Liu Yu in the 46th minute in a game that ended in a 1-1 draw. After several seasons with the club where he was unable to establish himself as a regular within the team and in 2011 he was loaned to China League Two side Fushun Xinye until 31 December.

In March 2012, Du transferred to China League One side Shenzhen Ruby. He would make his debut in a league game on 17 March 2012 against Beijing Baxy in a 1-0 victory. This would be followed by his first goal in the Chinese FA Cup on 1 June 2012 against Harbin Yiteng F.C. in a 2-0 win.  

On 13 January 2018, Du transferred to China League One side Wuhan Zall. He would be part of the  squad that gained promotion to the top tier with the club when they won the 2018 China League One division.

Career statistics 
Statistics accurate as of match played 31 December 2020.

Honours

Club
Wuhan Zall
 China League One: 2018

References

External links
 

1988 births
Living people
Chinese footballers
Footballers from Dalian
Dalian Shide F.C. players
Shenzhen F.C. players
Wuhan F.C. players
Chinese Super League players
China League One players
China League Two players
Association football defenders